The Brookside Shopping District is located in the  Brookside neighborhood of  Kansas City, Missouri at 63rd Street & Brookside Boulevard. This district was founded in 1920 as Kansas City's first suburban shopping center.

Tenants
 The New Dime Store
 Brookside Toy and Science Store 
 Cosentino's Brookside Price Chopper
 Cosentino's Brookside Market 
 CVS/pharmacy
 Bank of America
 Bank Midwest
 Commerce Bank
 Baskin-Robbins Ice Cream/Topsy's Restaurant
 The Roasterie
 Tuesday Morning
 Brookside Phillips 66
 Beauty Express
 Edward Jones
 Renner & Associates Surveying, LLC
 The UPS Store
 United States Postal Service
 Brookside Barkery and Bath
 Michael Forbes Grill
 Jalepeno's
 Charlie Hooper's Bar
 Brookside Real Estate Company
 Stuff
 Sweet And Simple
 Foo's Fabulous Frozen Custard
 World's Window
Starbucks
Red Door Grill
The Brooksider
Avenues Bistro
Panera
Jimmy Johns

Competition
 Country Club Plaza
 Metro Plaza Shopping Center
 The Landing Mall
 Waldo
 Ward Parkway Center
 Waldo Warriors

External links
Official Site
Brookside Kansas City Neighborhood Website

References

Shopping malls in Missouri
Economy of Kansas City, Missouri